Kelley J. Baker (born July 20, 1956) is an American independent filmmaker, writer, and director. His three indie feature films are Birddog (1999), The Gas Cafe (2001), and Kicking Bird (2005).

Education
Baker attended the University of Southern California. He received a BA (1980) and an MFA (1982) in Film Production from the USC School of Cinematic Arts and did post-graduate work at the American Film Institute (1989).[citation required]

Career
Baker was the recipient of the Western States Media Arts Fellowship (1997) as well as grants from the SOROS Fund (2000), The Collins Foundation (2000), the Oregon Arts Commission (1993), Pioneer Fund Emerging Documentary Filmmaker grant for his film Criminal Justice (1985), Rose E. Tucker Charitable Trust (1984), The Maurie Clark Foundation (1984), and a technical assistance grant from RACC (2004). Baker has completed two documentaries for the National Endowment for the Arts and the Juvenile Justice Office of the Department of Justice (1999).

Projects with other filmmakers 
He worked with Roger Corman as Assistant ADR (Automated Dialogue Replacement) Mixer on Humanoids from the Deep in 1996.

Books
Baker is the author of:

 The Angry Filmmaker Survival Guide: Making the Extreme No-Budget Film (2008) 
 From Arrah Wanna To Mule Shoe
 Dennis Barton is a Bastard 
 Road Dog.

Interviews

In 2021, Kelley appeared on the fifteenth episode of The Ghost of Hollywood, where he revisited his work with Gus Van Sant, Todd Haynes, and Will Vinton.

Filmography

Feature films

References

Film directors from Oregon
American male screenwriters
Pacific Northwest artists
Artists from Portland, Oregon
USC School of Cinematic Arts alumni
1956 births
Living people
Screenwriters from Oregon